Stuart Roberts (born 22 July 1980 in Carmarthen) is a Welsh former professional footballer. He is a midfielder and currently with Carmarthen Town. He has represented Wales at Under-21 level.

Roberts began his career as a trainee with Swansea City, turning professional in August 1998. His first team debut came on 11 August 1998 when he was a late substitute for Jon Coates in the 1–1 draw at home to Norwich City in the League Cup. His league debut came four days later in the 2–1 defeat away to Cambridge United, this time as a second-half substitute for Ryan Casey.

With Swansea in the midst of a financial crisis, Roberts spent part of the 2001 pre-season on trial with Rotherham United and moved to Wycombe Wanderers in October 2001 for a fee of £100,000. He remained with Wycombe until February 2004 when he returned to Swansea, initially on loan, but a month later on a free transfer. He later claimed that his time at Wycombe under Lawrie Sanchez had 'destroyed him as a player and a person'.

Released at the end of the season, he joined Chester City on a non-contract basis in June 2004.

Roberts joined Kidderminster Harriers in August 2004, but was released a month later and joined Forest Green Rovers. He was released by Forest Green at the end of the 2004–05 season.

In July 2005 he returned to Wales, joining Aberystwyth Town, where he was a regular for three years before joining Carmarthen Town in August 2008.

References

External links

Welsh Premier League profile

Living people
1980 births
Sportspeople from Carmarthen
Welsh footballers
Swansea City A.F.C. players
Wycombe Wanderers F.C. players
Chester City F.C. players
Kidderminster Harriers F.C. players
Forest Green Rovers F.C. players
Aberystwyth Town F.C. players
Carmarthen Town A.F.C. players
English Football League players
Cymru Premier players
Association football midfielders